Selvapuram is a major residential locality of the city of Coimbatore in Tamil Nadu, India.  It is located on the banks of Noyyal river, which runs to the northwestern boundary of the locality. It is situated in the northwestern part of the city, and is a major resedenial and industrial locality in the city. It is one of the well developed neighborhoods in the city and has been part of Coimbatore Corporation since 1866.

History
The locality of "Selvapuram" was previously known as "Pallapalayam". Later it was changed as "Selvapuram" with the name inspired from the nearby "Selva Chinthamani Kulam". It is a part of Coimbatore Municipal Corporation since 1866. It is now part of the south zone of the city.

Geography
The nerve centre of Selvapuram is Siruvani Road. The other major arterial roads are Ponnaiyarajapuram Road, Ukkadam Bypass Road connecting Selvapuram with Ukkadam, Sundakamuthur Bypass Road and Vadavlli Road. Selvapuram shares its border with Perur to the west, Ukkadam to the south, Townhall to the east and Ponnaiyarajapuram to the north. It shares its border with Townhall, Perur, Chokkampudur, Ukkadam, Ponnaiyarajapuram and Telugupalayam.

Locality

Restaurants
Milan Hotel
Thirumalai tiffen
Hotel Chola
Maran's Homemade biriyani

Hospitals
Snekaram Multi Speciality Hospital
R.R. Hospital
Rani hospital
Selvapuram Urban Primary Health Centre

Schools
Shirushti Vidhyalaya Matric Hr.Sec.School
Balavikash School
Milton Matric School

Transport
Selvapuram has easy access to :
 Gandhipuram : Via Raja Street, Oppanakkara Street, Mill Road and Nanjappa Road
 Coimbatore Integrated Bus Terminus : Via Ukkadam Bypass Road, Podanur Road and Chettipalayam Road
 Ukkadam : Via Ukkadam Bypass Road
 Railway Station : Via Ukkadam Bypass Road and Kottaimedu Road
 Coimbatore International Airport : Via Ukkadam Bypass Road, Sungam Bypass Road, Redfilelds Road and Eastern Avinashi Road

Coimbatore Metro
Coimbatore Metro feasibility study is completed and one of the route planned from Karunya Nagar to Ganeshapuram via Perur, Gandhipuram Central Bus Terminus, Saravanampatti covering .

TANGEDCO Sub-Power Station
The Tamil Nadu Generation and Distribution Corporation (Tangedco) is enhancing energy infrastructure in the district by establishing new sub-stations and enhancing capacities at many of the existing one at Selvapuram.

Politics 
Selvapuram is a part of Thondamuthur Assembly constituency and Pollachi (Lok Sabha constituency).

References

Neighbourhoods in Coimbatore